County Route 505 (CR 505) is a county highway in the U.S. state of New Jersey. The highway extends 20.64 miles (33.22 kilometers) from John F. Kennedy Boulevard (CR 501) in Union City to the New York state line in Northvale.

Route description

County Route 505 begins at County Route 501 in Union City, where it travels east and soon after entering Weehawken, it is named Boulevard East. It proceeds northward, traveling parallel to the Hudson River atop the Hudson Palisades. At Anthony M. DeFino Way in West New York it takes a right turn and descends to the waterfront becoming River Road through North Bergen and Edgewater, where it then intersects Route 5. In Fort Lee it intersects with Interstate 95. CR 505 then intersects the Palisades Interstate Parkway, before traveling parallel to it. It then intersects County Route 501, before turning due north from the westward path it had previously followed along. It travels by Morrow Park, shortly before traveling near the Knickerbocker Country Club. It then intersects County Route 70, before continuing north and intersecting County Route 502. From there, it proceeds north, reaching its end at the New York/New Jersey border.

History
Part of CR 505 was originally intended to New Jersey Route 303.

The 1955 USGS map of the Park Ridge Quadrangle shows CR 505 running south from the New York state line on Spring Valley Road in Montvale, then east on Grand Avenue, and south on Pascack Road through Park Ridge, Woodcliff Lake, and Hillsdale, all several miles west of its modern-day alignment.

Bike lanes on River Road were completed on July 24, 2012, in connection with a road re-paving project. They run a half mile from Palisades Medical Center in North Bergen and stretch southward towards Bulls Ferry Road in Weehawken.

There are numerous bridges along Boulevard East crossing over clefts in the cliffs, many approaching 100 years in age.
A portion of the road was closed for six-months in 2013 to replace one located in North Bergen.

Major intersections

CR 505 Truck 

County Route 505 Truck is a truck route bypassing the steep portion of CR 505 between US 9W in Englewood Cliffs and CR 501 in Englewood. The route follows US 9W south to Fort Lee before heading west along Route 4 to Englewood, where it heads north on CR 501.

Major intersections

See also

References

External links 

an enlarged view of road jurisdiction at the Fort Lee approaches to the George Washington Bridge
NJ State Highways: CR 200-514

505
505
505
505